Tororo Power Station may referrer to one of the following:

 Tororo Thermal Power Station, an operational 70 megawatt fossil fuel power plant
 Tororo Solar Power Station, an operational 10 megawatts solar power plant
 Tororo Wind Power Station, a proposed 20 megawatt wind-powered power plant